Milva Ekonomi (born in Tirana, Albania) is an Albanian politician. She is currently serving as the Minister of State for Standards and Services in the Albanian government of President Ilir Meta. She was appointed Minister of State for Standards and Services since September 10, 2021. She studied Statistics and Economics at the University of Agriculture, and a Master in Business Administration (MBA) from the University of Tirana.

Ekonomi was a lecturer at the University of Tirana, Agricultural University. She has been nationally and internationally published in the field of statistics, social and economic development, as well as gender studies.

She has also served as a member of the Municipal Council of Tirana from 2000 to 2011. Previously she was the Deputy Minister of Health from 2013 to 2016. In February 2016, she was appointed Minister of Economic Development, Tourism, Trade and Entrepreneurship. In January 2020, she became chair of the Committee on Economy and Finance. In December 2020, she was appointed Minister of Agriculture and Rural Development.

References 

Living people
Politicians from Tirana
21st-century Albanian politicians
21st-century Albanian women politicians
Government ministers of Albania
University of Tirana alumni
1962 births